Franz Dereani (born 10 September 1875, date of death unknown) was an Austrian fencer. He competed in the individual foil and sabre events at the 1912 Summer Olympics.

References

1875 births
Year of death missing
Austrian male foil fencers
Austrian male sabre fencers
Olympic fencers of Austria
Fencers at the 1912 Summer Olympics